Memphis International Airport  is a civil-military airport located  southeast of Downtown Memphis in Shelby County, Tennessee, United States. It is the primary international airport serving Memphis.

It is home to the FedEx Express global hub, often referred to as the FedEx Superhub or simply the Superhub, which processes many of the company's packages. Nonstop FedEx destinations from Memphis include cities across the continental United States, Canada, Europe, the Middle East, Asia and South America.

From 1993 to 2009, Memphis International had the largest cargo operations of any airport worldwide. It dropped to the second position in 2010, just behind Hong Kong. It still remained the busiest cargo airport in the United States and in the Western Hemisphere, until 2020, when it once again became the world's busiest cargo handling airport due to the surge in ecommerce partly caused by the COVID-19 pandemic.

The airport averages over 80 passenger flights per day. The 164th Airlift Wing of the Tennessee Air National Guard is based at the co-located Memphis Air National Guard Base, operating C-17 Globemaster III transport aircraft.

History

In its early years the airport had three hangars and an unpaved runway; passenger and air mail service was provided by American Airlines and Chicago and Southern Air Lines (acquired by Delta Air Lines in 1953). In 1939 Eastern Air Lines arrived; that March, Eastern had one departure a day to Muscle Shoals and beyond, American had four east/west and C&S had four north/south.

During World War II the United States Army Air Forces Air Transport Command 4th Ferrying Group used Memphis while sending new aircraft overseas. In April 1951 the runways were 6000-ft 2/20, 6530-ft 9/27, 4370-ft 14/32 and 4950-ft 17/35; the airport was all north of Winchester Road during the 1950s.

The April 1957 OAG shows 64 weekday departures: 25 on Delta, 18 American, 7 Southern, 5 Eastern, 4 Braniff, 3 Trans-Texas and 2 Capital. American DC-6s flew nonstop to Washington and New York, but westward nonstops did not reach beyond Fort Worth and Kansas City until American started Los Angeles in 1964. The first scheduled jets were Delta 880s ORD-MEM-MSY and back, starting in July–August 1960.

The current terminal was designed by Mann & Harrover and cost $6.5 million. It opened on June 7, 1963, and Memphis Municipal changed its name to Memphis International in 1969. In 1985–86 Republic Airlines began flights to Mexico. The terminal was expanded for $31.6 million in 1974, adding two new concourses and extending the others, which were designed by Roy P. Harrover & Associates.

Hub status
Southern Airways was an important regional carrier at Memphis in the 1960s; it merged into Republic Airlines in 1979 as the first large merger after the passage of the Airline Deregulation Act. With the dismantling of the Civil Aeronautics Board (CAB) flight approval requirements, airlines began developing around a large hub model as opposed to the former point-to-point networks that were common before deregulation. Republic established Memphis as a hub operation in 1985 before merging into Northwest Airlines in 1986. Northwest operated around 300 daily flights at the peak of the hub, including international flights to Canada, Mexico, and the Caribbean. Meanwhile, Northwest partner KLM launched the Tennessee city's first-ever transatlantic service in June 1995, using McDonnell Douglas MD-11s to fly to Amsterdam. The airport had spent $12.6 million on a new customs area in preparation for the route. KLM operated the flights until sometime between 2002 and 2003, when Northwest took over. Delta operated the route from the airline's merger with Northwest in 2008 to September 2012 when the route was discontinued.

Federal Express (now FedEx Express) began operations in Memphis in 1973. It opened its current "SuperHub" facility on the north side of the airport in 1981, and maintains a large presence to the present day.

Northwest was acquired by Delta Air Lines (which operates a large hub in Atlanta) in 2008, and Delta continued operating at Memphis as a hub, flying as many as 200 flights per day as recently as 2009. The carrier maintained the nonstop link to Amsterdam until 2012; it explained that expensive fuel, diminished passenger numbers, and the state of the American and European economies had compelled it to withdraw the service. Delta continued to scale back its operations at Memphis before closing the hub in 2013. Passenger traffic at the airport declined for the next several years until it bottomed out at 3.5 million in 2015.

Recent years
In 2014 the Memphis–Shelby County Airport Authority announced a planned $114 million renovation of the airport. This renovation included demolishing the largely vacant south ends of Concourses A and C, mothballing the remaining portions and widening and modernizing the larger Concourse B. The renovation, which was expected to start in late 2015 and end around 2020, would have left the airport with about 60 gates.

The initial project was only partly completed, with the south end of Concourse A demolished. Memphis officials decided to rethink the plans; several aspects of the project changed. The plan had called for renovating and widening Concourse B, the updated plan included a full redesign of most of the concourse. Concourse B was closed during construction, and airlines and tenants moved to Concourses A and C during that time. The southwest leg of Concourse B will be updated in a future phase, and will only be utilized in the near term for passengers from inbound international flights. The modernization began in September 2018 and was completed in February 2022.

Facilities

Terminal
Memphis International Airport has a single terminal and concourse with 23 gates. All non pre–cleared international flights are processed on the southwestern leg of the concourse.

Ground transportation
Memphis International Airport's passenger terminal can be accessed from Interstate 240 at exit 23B via Plough Blvd and Jim McGehee Pkwy. It can also be accessed via Winchester Rd.

MATA Bus #28 offers connections to the Hudson and Airways transit centers.

The Ground Transportation Center, completed in February 2013, contains the airport's economy parking and parking for all car rental companies.

Airlines and destinations

Passenger

Cargo

Statistics

Passenger traffic

Top destinations

Airline market share

Accidents and incidents
On August 12, 1944, a USAAF Douglas C-47 caught fire after takeoff after one of the propeller blades cut through the fuselage, causing a fire on the runway. All except the captain got out safely.
On December 17, 1944, a USAAF Douglas C-47 drifted to the right after takeoff, stalled and hit a brick storehouse. Three out of the six on board died.
On January 13, 1963, a Douglas DC-7 operated by the USAF struck a USAF Fairchild C-123 Provider taxiing at night. The pilot of the DC-7 was killed, and the Provider was destroyed after catching fire.
On May 18, 1978, a Dassault Falcon 20 C operated by Flight Safety International collided with a Cessna 150 3.8 miles west of MEM, all four occupants on the Falcon and two aboard the Cessna died as both aircraft crashed.
On August 11, 1984, Douglas C-47 N70003 of Aviation Enterprises crashed shortly after takeoff from Memphis International Airport on a domestic nonscheduled passenger flight to O'Hare International Airport, Chicago. All three people on board died. A missing spark plug on the port engine caused a loss of power. Maintenance involving the removal of the spark plugs had been performed the previous day.
On October 8, 1987, a Volpar Turboliner II operated by Connie Kalitta Services crashed while attempting to return to MEM due to an attached tail stand. The aircraft was overweight and the cg (Center of Gravity) was three inches forward of the limit. The sole occupant died.
On April 7, 1994, Federal Express Flight 705 bound for San Jose, California, experienced an attempted hijacking shortly after takeoff. FedEx employee Auburn Calloway tried to hijack the plane in order to crash it into the FedEx hub at Memphis International, in a Kamikaze-style attack. The crew—although seriously injured—fought him off and returned to Memphis, where police and emergency crews subdued him.
On December 18, 2003, FedEx Express Flight 647 veered off the runway after the landing gear collapsed upon landing. The flight had departed  Oakland International Airport (OAK) earlier that day. The aircraft was immediately engulfed in flames. All five crew members escaped by exiting via the cockpit window.
On July 28, 2006, FedEx Flight 630's landing gear collapsed upon landing at Memphis International Airport after a flight from Seattle–Tacoma International Airport. After coming to a stop, the plane caught fire, engulfing the left wing and engine. While the three crew members sustained injuries, they all survived. The aircraft was written off.

References

Further reading
 Hollahan, Terry. "Delta Air Lines deals crushing blow to Memphis airport." Memphis Business Journal. June 4, 2013.

External links

 
Memphis International Airport (official site)

 
Airports in Tennessee
Buildings and structures in Memphis, Tennessee
Transportation in Memphis, Tennessee
1929 establishments in Tennessee
Airports established in 1929